Ellen Tamaki is an American actress who played Niko Hamada in Charmed (2018–19) and Drea Mikami in Manifest since 2020.

Early life
Tamaki is from Brooklyn, New York City. She studied acting at the London Academy of Music and Dramatic Art, graduating in 2013. During her time as a student in London, she had theatre appearances as Lady Anne in Richard III and as Casca in Julius Caesar. Tamaki moved to the United States to study at the Boston University College of Fine Arts, graduating in 2014.

Acting career 
Tamaki was working on the One Year Lease Theater Company and Stages Repertory Theatre's production Balls at 59E59 Theaters in New York when the show's protagonist Billie-Jean King (played by Tamaki) showed up in real life to watch the play. After having several small roles in films and television from 2015, her first big break came in 2018, while working in New York theatre, she was offered a main role as the police detective Niko Hamada for 16 episodes of series 1 of the television series Charmed. Tamaki followed that television success with the recurring role of police officer Drea Mikami in the second series of Manifest in 2020. She continued in the role through to series 4 in 2022.

Filmography

Film

Television

References

External links 
 

Living people
21st-century American actresses
People from Brooklyn
American television actresses
American film actresses
American film actors of Asian descent
American actresses of Japanese descent
Actresses from New York City
People from New York City
Alumni of the London Academy of Music and Dramatic Art
Boston University College of Fine Arts alumni
Year of birth missing (living people)